Werner Rittberger (born 14 July 1891 in Berlin, Germany; died 12 August 1975 in Krefeld, Germany) was a German figure skater. Rittberger invented the Loop jump in 1910. German (and most other European) figure skaters call this jump “Rittberger”.

Rittberger won the German Nationals eleven times between 1911 and 1928, and the silver medal at the World Figure Skating Championships in 1910, 1911, and 1912. He skated for the Berliner SC club representing Germany.

After World War II he became a figure skating coach in Krefeld.

Results

References

Sources
 DEV 1890-1990, book
 Werner Rittberger at Sports Reference
 Der Eissport, 1922, No. 1

1891 births
1975 deaths
German male single skaters
Figure skaters at the 1928 Winter Olympics
Olympic figure skaters of Germany
World Figure Skating Championships medalists
European Figure Skating Championships medalists
Sportspeople from Berlin